The Jamaica national rugby union team represents Jamaica in the sport of rugby union. The team has thus far not qualified for a Rugby World Cup but has participated in qualifying tournaments.

The national side is ranked 67th in the world (as of 29 July 2019).

History
Jamaica played their first rugby international in 1960 losing 3-6 in a match with Trinidad and Tobago.

Jamaica competes in the Caribbean Championship, a tournament which includes Antigua, Trinidad and Tobago, the Cayman Islands, Bermuda, the Bahamas, British Virgin Islands, and Guyana.

Jamaica took part in qualifying for the 2003 Rugby World Cup. They were knocked out of Round 1 (North) of the Americas tournaments by Trinidad and Tobago, losing 51 to 5.

They attempted to qualify for the 2007 Rugby World Cup in June/July 2005. Jamaica drew their first game 10-all against Bermuda, but lost the second match against the Cayman Islands 8-18. They won their last game 5-3 over the Bahamas, and finished third in the group.

Jamaica entered the 2011 Rugby World Cup qualifyings, but lost to Guyana by 10-3, and were once again knocked out of the competition.

World Cup record
 1987 - Did Not Qualify 
 1991 - 1999 - Did Not Qualify 
 2003 - 2015 - Did Not Qualify 
 2019 - Did Not Qualify

See also
 Rugby union in Jamaica

References

External links
 Jamaica Rugby
 Jamaica at the IRB Official Site
 Jamaica  on rugbydata.com
 Jamaica Official Games

Caribbean national rugby union teams
Rugby union in Jamaica
rugby union